The 1943 Greensboro Tech-Hawks football team represented the Greensboro Army Air Forces Basic Training Center No. 10 during the 1943 college football season. Charley Trippi, who was later inducted into both the College and Pro Football Halls of Fame, starred for the team. The team compiled a perfect 4–0 record and was unbeaten, untied, and unscored upon. Captain Ralph Erickson was the team's head coach.

Schedule

References

Greensboro
Greensboro Tech-Hawks football
College football undefeated seasons
Greensboro Tech-Hawks football